Dusigitumab is a human monoclonal antibody designed for the treatment of cancer. It binds to IGF2. It was developed by MedImmune, which was acquired by AstraZeneca, using Xenomouse technology licensed from Abgenix. Its development has been discontinued.

References 

Monoclonal antibodies
Experimental cancer drugs
AstraZeneca brands